"Na Sou Tragoudo" is a 2013 pop and hip hop song by the Greek-Cypriot singer Ivi Adamou with the Greek hip hop band Stavento. It's their second collaboration, after San Erthi I Mera. A teaser was released on 22 February 2013 and was later announced that the song will be released on 4 March 2013.

Release
Stavento posted a photo from the shooting of the video clip on 6 February, announcing their second collaboration with Ivi Adamou.
The song was first heard along with the music video on MAD TV YouTube Channel and MAD Radio 106,2 on 4 March 2013.

Track listing
Digital download
"Na Sou Tragoudo" – 4:01

Credits and personnel
 Lead vocals – Stavento and Ivi Adamou
 Producers – Meth
 Lyrics – Meth
 Label: Sony Music Greece

Music video 
The video was first seen at MAD TV on 8 March 2013. It received 100,000 views in three days. The video was later uploaded in StaventoVEVO and currently has more than 2 million views.

Release history

References

2013 singles
Ivi Adamou songs
Stavento songs